Church Wood and Robsack Wood is a   Local Nature Reserve in Hastings in East Sussex. It is owned and managed by Hastings Borough Council.

This site in four separate areas has semi-natural woodland, semi-improved grassland and streams. Woodland flora include toothwort, goldilocks buttercup and early purple orchid.

References

Local Nature Reserves in East Sussex
Hastings